Peter Lanchene Toobu (born 8 June 1968) is a Ghanaian retired police officer and politician who is a member of the National Democratic Congress. He is the member of Parliament for the Wa West Constituency in the Upper West region.  He is a Retired Superintendent of Police in Ghana.

Early life and education 
Toobu was born on 8 June 1968. He hails from Jirapa in the Upper West Region of Ghana. He has his secondary school education at Lawra Secondary School in Lawra in the Upper West Region of Ghana. He was trained as Police Officer at the Ghana Police Academy. He holds a Master of Arts degree in Leadership from the Kofi Annan International Peacekeeping Training Centre.

Career 
Toobu served in the Ghana Police Service and rose to the rank of Superintendent of Police before retiring. He served as the Executive Secretary to the former Inspector General of Police (IGP) David Asante Apeatu from 2017 until he resigned and retired from the service to go into Politics in 2019.

Politics

Parliamentary bid 
Toobu won the parliamentary bid to represent the National Democratic Congress for the Wa West Constituency ahead of the 2020 elections in August 2019 after securing 775 votes to beat incumbent member of parliament former Minister of Local Government Joseph Yieleh Chireh who polled 317 votes and who had served as MP since 2004.

Ahead of the 2020 General elections he was appointed as the National Democratic Congress’ (NDC) Spokesperson on Security and was heard on various radio and television stations speaking about policies his party had concerning security.

In December 2020, Toobu won the Wa West Constituency seat in the parliamentary elections. He won by polling 27,550 votes against his closest opponent, Dari Daniel Kuusongno who obtained 13,143 votes from the 40,829 total votes cast.

Member of parliament 
On 7 January 2021, Toobu was sworn in as Member of Parliament representing the Wa West Constituency in the 8th Parliament of the 4th Republic of Ghana. He serves as a member on the Members Holding Offices of Profit Committee and the Defence and Interior Committee of Parliament.

On 6 April 2021, he petitioned the Speaker of Parliament, Alban Bagbin to draw the President's attention to issues relating to security and address the growing insecurity within Ghana. He pointed out armed robbery cases in his constituency, Wa West and surrounding areas from Sissala East to Bawku West.

Personal life 
Toobu is a Christian.

References

External links 
 Peter Lanchene Toobu, GhanaMPs Profile

Living people
National Democratic Congress (Ghana) politicians
People from Upper West Region
Ghanaian MPs 2021–2025
Ghanaian police officers
1968 births
University of Ghana alumni